Jacob Bender (born December 9, 1994) is an American soccer player.

Career

College and amateur
Bender played college soccer at Messiah University from 2013 to 2016.

While at college, Bender also appeared for USL PDL club Baltimore Bohemians between 2014 and 2016.

Professional
Bender signed with United Soccer League side Charlotte Independence on March 29, 2017.

References

1994 births
Living people
American soccer players
Messiah Falcons men's soccer players
Baltimore Bohemians players
Charlotte Independence players
Soccer players from Baltimore
USL League Two players
USL Championship players
Association football midfielders